Museum of Biblical Art may refer to:

 Museum of Biblical Art (Dallas)
 Museum of Biblical Art (New York City)